The South Okkalapa Women and Children Hospital is a 150-bedded specialist public hospital in South Okkalapa Township of Yangon. Colonel Tun Sein (B.A Zeyya Kyaw Htin Thiripyin Chi Thu) laid foundation for the hospital on 18 February 1960 and U Nu, the first Prime Minister of Myanmar, officially opened it as a Catholic Missionary Hospital on 1 May 1961. It became a 100-bedded specialist hospital for women and children on 12 July 1965 and then was upgraded to a 150-bedded Women and Children Hospital on 19 August 1987.

It is also a teaching hospital affiliated with University of Medicine 2, Yangon.

Services Providing Areas
The hospital is providing services for the following townships. 
 South Okkalapa Township
 Thingangyun Township
 South Dagon Township
 North Dagon Township
 East Dagon Township
 Yankin Township

Inpatient Wards 
 Obstetrics Wards
 Gynaecology Wards
 Paediatric Ward
 Neonatal Unit

Medical Superintendent 
Dr. Win Maw Oo - M.B.,B.S, Dip.Meds.Sc (Hospital Administration)

See also
 List of hospitals in Yangon

References

Hospitals in Yangon